Wenas is an unincorporated community in Yakima County, Washington, United States, located approximately twenty miles northwest of Selah.

The community developed along Wenas Creek, a favorite hunting location of Native Americans. The name means "last camping" in the Native American language and was spelled Wenass on early maps.

References

Unincorporated communities in Yakima County, Washington
Unincorporated communities in Washington (state)